The Caudron G.3 was a single-engined French sesquiplane built by Caudron, widely used in World War I as a reconnaissance aircraft and trainer.

Development
The Caudron G.3 was designed by René and Gaston Caudron as a development of their earlier Caudron G.2 for military use. It first flew in May 1914 at their Le Crotoy aerodrome.

The aircraft had a short crew nacelle, with a single engine in the nose of the nacelle, and an open tailboom truss. It was of sesquiplane layout, and used wing warping for lateral control, although this was replaced by conventional ailerons fitted on the upper wing in late production aircraft. Usually, the G.3 was not armed, although sometimes light machine guns and small bombs were fitted.

It was ordered in large quantities following the outbreak of the First World War with the Caudron factories building 1423 of the 2450  built in France. 233 were also built in England and 166 built in Italy along with several other countries. The Caudron brothers did not charge a licensing fee for the design, as an act of patriotism.

It was followed in production by the Caudron G.4, which was a twin-engined development.

Operational history
 

 
The G.3 equipped Escadrille C.11 of the French Aéronautique Militaire at the outbreak of war, and was well-suited for reconnaissance use, proving stable and having good visibility. As the war progressed, its low performance and lack of armament made it too vulnerable for front line service, and it was withdrawn from front line operations in mid-1916.

The Italians also used the G.3 for reconnaissance on a wide scale until 1917, as did the British RFC (continuing operations until October 1917), who fitted some with light bombs and machine guns for ground attack. The Australian Flying Corps operated the G.3 during the Mesopotamian campaign of 1915–16.

It continued in use as a trainer until well after the end of the war. Chinese Fengtian clique warlord Caudron G.3s remained in service as trainers until the Mukden Incident of 1931, when many were captured by the Japanese.

In 1921 Adrienne Bolland, a French test pilot working for Caudron, made the first crossing of the Andes by a woman, flying between Argentina and Chile in a G.3.

Variants
Most G.3s were the A2 model, used by various airforces for artillery spotting on the Western front, in Russia and in the Middle East. The G.3 D2 was a two-seat trainer, equipped with dual controls and the E2 was a basic trainer. The R1 version (rouleur or roller) was used by France and the United States Air Service for taxi training, with the wing trimmed down to prevent its becoming airborne. The last version, the G.3. L2, was equipped with a more powerful  Anzani 10 radial engine. In Germany, Gotha built a few copies of the G.3 as the Gotha LD.3 and Gotha LD.4 (Land Doppeldecker – "Land Biplane").

Survivors
Few Caudron G.3s survived and most of them are displayed in museums:

- one restored as s/n 324 at the Musée de l'Air et de l'Espace, Paris,

- one restored as s/n 2531 at the Royal Museum of the Armed Forces, Brussels,

- one restored as 1E18 at the Hallinportti Aviation Museum in Finland,

- one restored as 3066, at the RAF Museum Hendon,

- one restored at the Museu Aeroespacial of Rio de Janeiro,

- one rebuilt from original parts displayed in the Museum of Maracaï in Venezuela. including.

One Caudron G.3 is part of a private collection in France but unrestored.

Replicas 
A Caudron G.3 replica is part of the rotary engined contingent of accurately-built vintage aircraft reproductions, at the Old Rhinebeck Aerodrome living aviation museum, in Rhinebeck, New York.

In France, a replica is currently airworthy at La Ferté Alais, powered by a Walter radial engine.

As of 2017, another airworthy replica of the G.3 was introduced to the collections of the Aviation Museum of Metoděj Vlach in Mladá Boleslav, the Czech Republic. Though a replica  visually accurate in dimensions and appearance, it was built on an ultralight basis. The project development began in 2009, and the replica was closely based on a Caudron G.3 displayed in the Musée de l’air et de l’espace in Le Bourget, Paris.

Operators

Argentine Air Force

Mesopotamian Half Flight
Central Flying School AFC at Point Cook, Victoria.
Belgian Air Force

Brazilian Air Force

Republic of China Air Force - Purchased 12 from France in 1913.
Colombian Air Force – Three aircraft became Colombia's first military aircraft.
Royal Danish Air Force
Air Force of El Salvador – Three aircraft. 
Finnish Air Force – 12 from France in 1920, six built in Finland by Santahaminan ilmailutelakka from 1921 to 1923. One from Flyg Aktiebolaget in 1923. Withdrawn 1924. Nicknamed Tutankhamon.

 
French Air Force – Operated by 38 ''escadrilles.
 Hellenic Air Force

Guatemalan Air Force

Hejaz Air Force – built in Italy

Honduran Air Force 

 Corpo Aeronautico Militare

Imperial Japanese Army Air Service
 
Peruvian Air Force – One aircraft only.
Portuguese Air Force
Polish Air Force
 Romanian Air Corps
 Imperial Russian Air Force

Serbian Air Force and Air Defense
 Kingdom of Spain
Spanish Air Force – Eighteen bought in 1919 for training at Getafe, Seville and Los Alcázares, replaced by Avro 504Ks in 1924.
 Soviet Air Force – ex-Imperial Russian Air Force.
 Turkish Air Force – Postwar.

 
Royal Flying Corps
No. 1 Squadron RFC
No. 4 Squadron RFC
No. 5 Squadron RFC
No. 19 Squadron RFC
No. 23 Squadron RFC
No. 25 Squadron RFC
No. 29 Squadron RFC
Royal Naval Air Service – operated 140 primarily as trainers

American Expeditionary Force
United States Army Air Service
Venezuelan Air Force

Specifications (G.3)

See also

References

Bibliography

Further reading

External links

 Caudron G.3 (airminded.net)
 RAF Museum
 Old Rhinebeck Aerodrome's Caudron G.III page

1910s French military reconnaissance aircraft
1910s French military trainer aircraft
G.3
Sesquiplanes
Single-engined tractor aircraft
Aircraft first flown in 1913
Rotary-engined aircraft